Victoria Mitchell (born 25 April 1982) is an Australian long-distance runner who specializes in the 3000 metres steeplechase.

Victoria took part in the World Student Cross Country Championships in 2002 and finished in eleventh place.

Victoria won two Horizon League Cross Country Championships in 2004 and 2005 as a Butler University student-athlete.

Victoria finished fourth at the 2005 NCAA Women's Division I Cross Country Championship as a Butler University senior in a time of 19:50.4.

Mitchell won the 2005 NCAA Division I steeplechase national championship, while competing at Butler.

Her first international medal was a silver at the 2005 Summer Universiade. She was the 2007 winner of the Great Ireland Run. She represented Australia at the Olympics at the 2008 Beijing Games.

Achievements

Personal bests
One mile - 4:38.05 min (2006)
3000 metres - 8:58.42 min (2006)
3000 metres steeplechase - 9:30.84 min (2006)
5000 metres - 15:36.15 min (2006)

International competition
2002 World Student Cross Ctry 		Cross Country (6 km)	11/57	11th 20:50
2005 Universiade 		3,000 metres Steeplechase	2/15	2nd 9:47.54
2006 Commonwealth Games 		3,000 metres Steeplechase	4/15	4th 9:34.24
2006 World Cup 		3,000 metres Steeplechase	4/9	4th 9:36.34
2006 World Cross Ctry 		Cross Country (8 km)	34/99	34th 27:12
2006 Short Course XC (4 km)	33/92	33rd 13:36
2007 World Championships 		3,000 metres Steeplechase	35/54	Ht3 14th 10:06.61
2007 World Cross Ctry 		Cross Country	37/94	37th 29:48
2008 Olympic Games 		3,000 metres Steeplechase	32/51	Ht1 13th 9:47.88
2008 World Cross Ctry 		Cross Country (7.905 km)	54/99	54th 27:57
2014 Commonwealth Games 		3,000 metres Steeplechase	9/11	Final 9th 9:49.05
2015 World Championships 		3,000 metres Steeplechase		
2015 World Cross Ctry 		Cross Country (8 km)	40/83	40th 29:11

2016 Rio Olympics 3,000m steeplechase

National competition
2000 Aust. Junior Cross Ctry 		Junior XC (6 km)	2	23:05.0
2000-01 Aust. Junior T & F 		2,000 metres Steeplechase	1	6:50.90
2001 Aust. Junior Cross Ctry 		Junior XC (6 km)	3	22:20.0
2001-02 Aust. T & F 		3,000 metres Steeplechase	2	10:36.98
2002-03 Aust. T & F 		3,000 metres Steeplechase	1	10:20.60
2003 Aust. U23 Cross Country 		Cross Country (8 km)	4 (3rd Aust.)	29:48
2005-06 Aust. T & F 		3,000 metres Steeplechase	4 (3rd Aust.)	9:44.06
2007-08 Aust. T & F 		3,000 metres Steeplechase	3	10:03.35
2010-11 Aust. T & F 		3,000 metres Steeplechase	1	10:10.66
2011-12 Aust. T & F 		3,000 metres Steeplechase	2	10:08.91
2013-14 Aust. T & F 		3,000 metres Steeplechase	1	9:42.01
2014-15 Aust. T & F 		5,000 metres	4 (2nd Aust.)	15:45.72

References

 
 Victoria Mitchell at Australian Athletics Historical Results

External links
 
 
 
 
 

1982 births
Living people
Athletes from Melbourne
Australian female steeplechase runners
Australian female long-distance runners
Athletes (track and field) at the 2008 Summer Olympics
Olympic athletes of Australia
Commonwealth Games competitors for Australia
Athletes (track and field) at the 2006 Commonwealth Games
Athletes (track and field) at the 2014 Commonwealth Games
Athletes (track and field) at the 2018 Commonwealth Games
World Athletics Championships athletes for Australia
Athletes (track and field) at the 2016 Summer Olympics
Universiade medalists in athletics (track and field)
Universiade silver medalists for Australia
Medalists at the 2005 Summer Universiade
21st-century Australian women
People from Oakleigh, Victoria
Butler Bulldogs women's track and field athletes
Sportswomen from Victoria (Australia)